Santomera Club de Fútbol is a football team based in Santomera, Murcia. Founded in 1948, the team plays in Preferente Autonómica. 

The club's home ground is Estadio El Limonar.

Season to season

21 seasons in Tercera División

External links
Futbolme team profile 

Football clubs in the Region of Murcia
Association football clubs established in 1948
Divisiones Regionales de Fútbol clubs
1948 establishments in Spain